Ioannis Kosti (born 17 March 2000) is a Cypriot professional footballer who plays as a central midfielder for Super League 2 club Olympiacos B and the Cyprus national team.

Club career
On 15 October 2019, the 19-year-old international Cypriot midfielder signed a five-year contract with Greek giants Olympiacos for an undisclosed fee and will remain in Nea Salamina until the end of the 2019-20 season.

On 5 October 2020, Kosti was loaned to Greek club AEL.

On 10 February 2021, Kosti moved to Super League 2 club Levadiakos, on a loan deal.

International career
He made his Cyprus national football team debut on 8 June 2019 in a Euro 2020 qualifier against Scotland, as a 70th-minute substitute for Matija Špoljarić.

References

External links

2000 births
Living people
Cypriot footballers
Cyprus youth international footballers
Cyprus international footballers
Association football defenders
Nea Salamis Famagusta FC players
Athlitiki Enosi Larissa F.C. players
Cypriot First Division players
Super League Greece players
Olympiacos F.C. B players
Expatriate footballers in Greece
Cypriot expatriate footballers
Cypriot expatriate sportspeople in Greece
People from Larnaca